Sawyerpuram is a panchayat town in Thoothukudi district in the Indian state of Tamil Nadu.

Demographics
 India census, Sawyerpuram had a population of 12,772. Males constitute 49% of the population and females 51%. Sawyerpuram has an average literacy rate of 80%, higher than the national average of 59.5%: male literacy is 82%, and female literacy is 77%. In Sawyerpuram, 11% of the population is under 6 years of age.

References

Cities and towns in Thoothukudi district